Julian–Clark House, also known as the Julian Mansion, is a historic home located at Indianapolis, Marion County, Indiana.  It was built in 1873, and is a -story, Italianate style brick dwelling.  It has a low-pitched hipped roof with bracketed eaves and a full-width front porch.  It features a two-story projecting bay and paired arched windows on the second story.  From 1945 to 1973, the building housed Huff's Sanitarium.

It was added to the National Register of Historic Places in 1986.

References

Houses on the National Register of Historic Places in Indiana
Italianate architecture in Indiana
Houses completed in 1873
Houses in Indianapolis
National Register of Historic Places in Indianapolis